Wolica  is a village in the administrative district of Gmina Nadarzyn, within Pruszków County, Masovian Voivodeship, in east-central Poland.

In 2005 the village had a population of 510.

References

Wolica